Nicholas Kenny (born 13 March 1993) is a Welsh professional darts player who currently plays in Professional Darts Corporation Events. He took a Bronze medal in the WDF Europe Cup.

Career

Kenny won the WDF European Cup youth Singles in 2010. In 2016 he qualified for the BDO World Trophy but was defeated by Mark McGeeney 7-6 in the last 16 of the competition, having beaten fifth seed Wesley Harms in the first round. Kenny faced first seed Glen Durrant in the first round of the 2017 BDO World Darts Championship, he lost 3–1.

Kenny won a two-year PDC Tour Card on the final day of 2020 Q-School. During his first season he appeared on 2020 UK Open, where he was eliminated in the second round. He was unable to qualify for other major tournaments throughout the year, but he won the UK Tour Card Holders' Qualifier and secured his spot on 2021 PDC World Darts Championship. In his debut he faced Dutchman Derk Telnekes and won in the deciding set 3-2. In the second round he lost to another Dutchman, Jermaine Wattimena 1-3 on sets. After the first year with the Tour card, Kenny earned £23 000 and placed 89th in the PDC Order of Merit.

In 2021 he appeared on 2021 UK Open, where he was seeded into the second round. There he won over Ryan Meikle in the deciding leg 6-5, in the third round he lost in another deciding leg 5-6 to Kai Fan Leung. In November he qualified for the second time in the row via PDPA Qualifier and secured his spot at 2022 PDC World Darts Championship.
Being outside of top 64 of the PDC Order of Merit, Kenny had to win at least the first round to keep alive the chance for securing his Tour card. He lost in the first round 0-3 to Rowby-John Rodriguez, placing 74th in the ranking and lost his Tour card.

On 15th January 2023, Nick regained a two-year PDC Tour Card on the final day of Q-School, finishing 4th in the Order of Merit.

World Championship results

BDO/WDF
 2017: First round (lost to Glen Durrant 1–3)
 2018: First round (lost to Willem Mandigers 0–3)
 2020: First round (lost to Dennie Olde Kalter 2–3)

PDC
 2021: Second round (lost to Jermaine Wattimena 1–3)
 2022: First round (lost to Rowby-John Rodriguez 0–3)

Performance timeline

BDO

PDC

External links

Living people
Welsh darts players
British Darts Organisation players
Professional Darts Corporation current tour card holders
1993 births